Tyumen is the name of several inhabited localities in Russia.

Urban localities
Tyumen, a city in Tyumen Oblast

Rural localities
Tyumen, Altai Krai, a selo in Belovsky Selsoviet of Troitsky District in Altai Krai; 
Tyumen, Irkutsk Oblast, a village in Cheremkhovsky District of Irkutsk Oblast
Tyumen, Kirov Oblast, a village in Spas-Talitsky Rural Okrug of Orichevsky District in Kirov Oblast; 
Tyumen, Perm Krai, a village in Yusvinsky District of Perm Krai